James (Jim) W.H. Monger is an emeritus scientist of the Geological Survey of Canada and a world leader in the application of plate tectonics to the study of mountain chain formation.

Education
Monger obtained his BSc at the University of Reading, his MSc at the University of Kansas, and his PhD at the University of British Columbia (1966).

Career
Dr. James Monger is an authority on Cordilleran geology. Monger concentrated his research on field studies and detailed geological mapping of upper Paleozoic and lower Mesozoic volcanic and sedimentary layers. He used this work to demonstrate that the Canadian Cordillera is a collage of displaced terranes that have been accreted to the western margin of North America.

Over his 40-year career as a research geoscientist with the Geological Survey of Canada he contributed the following to geological studies; 
 the first plate tectonic interpretations of the evolution of the Canadian Cordillera
 the first metamorphic map of the Canadian Cordillera
 an award-winning paper on suspect terranes that evolved into the first terrane map of the Cordillera 
 a proposal for the collisional origin for the two major plutonic belts
 the first trans-Cordilleran structure section that integrated geological, geophysical and geochemical data.

Monger led the Global Geoscience Transects Project. He had an essential role in the Canadian LITHOPROBE Project.

In 1997, Dr. Monger began working at the Simon Fraser University as an adjunct professor in the Department of Earth Science. There he has developed and taught an undergraduate course and collaborate on research projects with earth science faculty and researchers

Personal life
As of 2006, he was living on the Saltspring Island in  British Columbia, Canada.

Awards
1995 - Presented the R. J. W. Douglas Medal by the Canadian Society of Petroleum Geologists
2002 - The Logan Medal is the highest award of the Geological Association of Canada.

Publications
 1987 - authored Circum-Pacific Orogenic Belts and Evolution of the Pacific Ocean Basin.  
 2003 - co-authored with R. A. Price, Transect Of The Southern Canadian Cordillera From Calgary To Vancouver: Field Trip Guidebook 2003
 2005 - co-authored with William Henry Mathews, Roadside Geology of Southern British Columbia

References
  Geological Association of Canada Newsletter December 1997
 Geological Association of Canada Newsletter June 2002
 Canadian Society of Petroleum Geologists Awards
 Books by J.W.H. Monger
 Simon Fraser University Department of Earth Sciences
 Simon Fraser University press clippings
 A History of the Canadian Cordillera

Living people
Canadian geologists
Geological Survey of Canada personnel
Alumni of the University of Reading
University of Kansas alumni
University of British Columbia alumni
Logan Medal recipients
Year of birth missing (living people)